SPRS may refer to
 Shorncliffe Redoubt Preservation Society
 Scottish Railway Preservation Society who operate the Bo'ness & Kinneil Railway and SRPS Railtours
 Beijing Shuren Ribet Private School